This was the first edition of the tournament.

Priska Madelyn Nugroho and Wei Sijia won the title, defeating Isabelle Haverlag and Suzan Lamens in the final, 6–3, 6–2.

Seeds

Draw

Draw

References

External Links
Main Draw

Open Feu Aziz Zouhir - Doubles